The Men's 50 metre freestyle S7 swimming event at the 2004 Summer Paralympics was competed on 26 September. It was won by David Roberts, representing .

1st round

Heat 1
26 September 2004, morning session

Heat 2
26 September 2004, morning session

Final round

26 September 2004, evening session

References

M